In mathematics, a fundamental pair of periods is an ordered pair of complex numbers that define a lattice in the complex plane. This type of lattice is the underlying object with which elliptic functions and modular forms are defined.

Definition
A fundamental pair of periods is a pair of complex numbers  such that their ratio ω2/ω1 is not real. The lattice generated by ω1 and ω2 is

This lattice is also sometimes denoted as Λ(ω1, ω2) to make clear that it depends on ω1 and ω2. It is also sometimes denoted by Ω or Ω(ω1, ω2), or simply by ⟨ω1, ω2⟩. The two generators ω1 and ω2 are called the lattice basis.

While a fundamental pair generates a lattice, a lattice does not have any unique fundamental pair; in fact, an infinite number of fundamental pairs correspond to the same lattice.

Algebraic properties
A number of properties, listed below, can be seen.

Equivalence

Two pairs of complex numbers (ω1,ω2) and (α1,α2) are called equivalent if they generate the same lattice: that is, if ⟨ω1,ω2⟩ = ⟨α1,α2⟩.

No interior points
The fundamental parallelogram contains no further lattice points in its interior or boundary.  Conversely, any pair of lattice points with this property constitute a fundamental pair, and furthermore, they generate the same lattice.

Modular symmetry

that is, so that

and

This matrix belongs to the matrix group , which is known as the modular group.  This equivalence of lattices can be thought of as underlying many of the properties of elliptic functions (especially the Weierstrass elliptic function) and modular forms.

Topological properties 
The abelian group  maps the complex plane into the fundamental parallelogram.

Since this mapping identifies opposite sides of the parallelogram as being the same, the fundamental parallelogram has the topology of a torus. Equivalently, one says that the quotient manifold  is a torus.

Fundamental region

Define τ = ω2/ω1 to be the half-period ratio.  Then the lattice basis can always be chosen so that τ lies in a special region, called the fundamental domain.  Alternately, there always exists an element of PSL(2,Z) that maps a lattice basis to another basis so that τ lies in the fundamental domain.

The fundamental domain is given by the set D, which is composed of a set U plus a part of the boundary of U:

where H is the upper half-plane.

The fundamental domain D is then built by adding the boundary on the left plus half the arc on the bottom:

Three cases pertain:

In the closure of the fundamental domain:  and

See also
 A number of alternative notations for the lattice and for the fundamental pair exist, and are often used in its place.  See, for example, the articles on the nome, elliptic modulus, quarter period and half-period ratio.
 Elliptic curve
 Modular form
 Eisenstein series

References
 Tom M. Apostol, Modular functions and Dirichlet Series in Number Theory (1990), Springer-Verlag, New York.  (See chapters 1 and 2.)
 Jurgen Jost, Compact Riemann Surfaces (2002), Springer-Verlag, New York.  (See chapter 2.)

Riemann surfaces
Modular forms
Elliptic functions
Lattice points